David Foster (born 1949) is a Canadian musician, record producer, and pianist.

David Foster may also refer to:

Dave Foster, American drummer, briefly with Nirvana in 1988
David Foster (cricketer, born 1959), English cricketer
David Foster (equestrian) (1955–1998), Irish equestrian
David Foster (novelist) (born 1944), Australian novelist
David Foster (Royal Navy officer) (1920–2010), pilot
David Foster (rugby league), rugby league footballer of the 1990s and 2000s
David Foster (woodchopper) (born 1957), Australian woodchopper
David J. Foster (1857–1912), U.S. Representative from Vermont
David Jack Foster (1859–1948), U.S. brigadier general during World War I
David Foster (writer), American television writer (House), producer and medical doctor
David Blythe Foster (1858–1948), British politician, Lord Mayor of Leeds
David Kirby Foster (1882–1969), Baptist minister, community leader and counselor to President Harry S. Truman
David Foster (film producer) (1929–2019), American film producer (The Mask of Zorro, The Thing) 
David Foster (1946–2017), Vocalist, songwriter and bass guitarist of The Warriors and Badger. Also contributed to Time and a World by Yes.

See also
David Foster (album), 1986
David Foster (game character)
David Foster Wallace (1962–2008), American novelist, essayist, and short-story writer